Bifunctional purine biosynthesis protein PURH is a protein that in humans is encoded by the ATIC gene.

ATIC encodes an enzyme which generates inosine monophosphate from aminoimidazole carboxamide ribonucleotide.

It has two functions:

  - 5-aminoimidazole-4-carboxamide ribonucleotide formyltransferase
  - IMP cyclohydrolase

References

Further reading

External links